The 1573  was undertaken by Oda Nobunaga, a powerful warlord (daimyō) of Japan's Sengoku period. It was one of several actions taken in a series of campaigns against the Asakura and Azai clans, which opposed his growing power.

Ichijōdani Castle, the castle home of Asakura Yoshikage, was one of several lavishly furnished castles which can be said to typify the Azuchi-Momoyama period. Excavations and research at the ruins of the castle have revealed that, much like Toyotomi Hideyoshi's castle at Fushimi, Ichijōdani was a luxury home with a library, garden, and elegantly decorated rooms.

Prelude

In 1573, Nobunaga besieged Odani castle, which was held by Azai Nagamasa. Asakura Yoshikage, leading a force to relieve and reinforce the Azai garrison, came under attack by Nobunaga's army. He sought refuge in Hikida Castle, and came under siege at Hikida by Oda forces. Hikida castle fell on August 10, and Asakura fled back to his home province of Echizen.

Battle
In September 1573, Nobunaga led an army of 30,000 soldiers, departing from Gifu Castle to invade Ōmi Province, surrounding Odani Castle, however Asakura Yoshikage led 20,000 reinforcement to support Azai Nagamasa. 

Later, Nobunaga battled against Yoshikage at Tonezaka, Yoshikage was defeated, and Saito Tatsuoki who become guest commander of Asakura, was also killed in this battle, at the age of 26.  

Nobunaga pursue Yoshikage and attacked the town of Ichijōdani, seizing control from the Asakura clan and burning it down. 
Yoshikage fled Ichijōdani castle with only his own troops and, upon the urging of Asakura Kageakira, at the Rokubō-kenshō monastery proposed by Kageakira as a temporary place to stay. However, Yoshikage was thoroughly surrounded by troops under Kageakira who betrayed him. As the attendants fought and died, Yoshikage killed himself.

Aftermath
After Yoshikage died, Asakura Kageakira made efforts to negotiate with Oda for his lives and status, but the Oda army executed him.

Later, Oda Nobunaga's forces returned to northern Ōmi and attacked Odani castle in October, 1573, devastating Azai Nagamasa and the Azai clan.

See also
Battle of Anegawa
Siege of Odani Castle

References

Ichijodani Castle 1573
1573 in Japan
Conflicts in 1573
Ichijodani Castle 1573
Ichijōdani Castle